Buggiano is a comune (municipality) in the Province of Pistoia in the Italian region Tuscany, located about  northwest of Florence and about  southwest of Pistoia.

Main sights
Sanctuary of the Holy Crucifix (18th century)
Pieve di Sant'Andrea (11th century).
Pieve of San Lorenzo (13th century), remade in the two following centuries. It has a Romanesque bell tower with double mullioned windows, including the basement of an 11th-century tower. The interior has several 16th-century canvasses and a 14th-century crucifix.
Church of Madonna della Salute e di San Nicolao (11th century). It houses a 12th-13th century marble baptismal font with intarsia and a 1442 Annunciation by Bicci di Lorenzo.
Villa Bellavista

Twin cities
 Ascheberg, Germany

People
Benito Lorenzi (footballer)

Vasco Ferretti (writer)

References

External links

 Official website

Cities and towns in Tuscany